Falling Spring Township is an inactive township in Oregon County, in the U.S. state of Missouri.

Falling Spring Township took its name from a cascading spring of the same name within its borders.

References

Townships in Missouri
Townships in Oregon County, Missouri